Steven Vidler (born 28 August 1977) is a retired Scottish middleweight judoka.

Judo career
Vidler won a bronze medal at the 2002 Commonwealth Games. He also won the silver medal at the 2000 Commonwealth Championships and the gold medal at the 2006 Commonwealth Championships. He finished in a seventh place at the 2005 European Judo Championships, seventh in the 2005 World Cup meet in Rome, and won two US Open events in 2003 and 2004.

He became champion of Great Britain, winning the middleweight division at the British Judo Championships in 2004.

Personal life
He is married to Olympian Michelle Rogers, whom he also coaches. They have a daughter.

References 

1977 births
Living people
Scottish male judoka
Commonwealth Games bronze medallists for Scotland
Judoka at the 2002 Commonwealth Games
Scottish sports coaches
Commonwealth Games medallists in judo
Medallists at the 2002 Commonwealth Games